Langenthal railway station is a railway station in the municipality of Langenthal, in the Swiss canton of Bern. It is located at the junction of the standard gauge Langenthal–Huttwil line of BLS AG and Olten–Bern line of Swiss Federal Railways. The station is also the junction of the  gauge Langenthal–Oensingen and Langenthal–Melchnau lines of Aare Seeland mobil.

Services 
The following services stop at Langenthal:

 Regio:

References

External links 
 
 

Railway stations in the canton of Bern
Swiss Federal Railways stations